Milton Francois D'Eliscu (November 10, 1895 – October 15, 1972) was an American military officer, football and basketball coach, and college athletics administrator.  He served as the head football coach at Temple University from 1922 to 1923, compiling a record of 1–9–1.  D'Eliscu was also the head basketball coach at Temple from 1919 to 1923, tallying a mark of 30–22.  He was the athletic director at the University of Hawaii at Manoa from 1946 to 1947.  D'Eliscu was an alumnus of Swarthmore College.  He died on October 15, 1972 in Sarasota, Florida.

Head coaching record

Football

Bibliography

References

External links
 
 

1895 births
1972 deaths
Basketball coaches from New York (state)
Hawaii Rainbow Warriors and Rainbow Wahine athletic directors
Temple Owls football coaches
Temple Owls men's basketball coaches
Swarthmore College alumni
Sportspeople from New York City
American people of Romanian descent